Kyle Baillie (born April 7, 1991) is a Canadian rugby union player. He plays as a flanker or lock for the Canadian national team and the Toronto Arrows of Major League Rugby (MLR). He previously played for NOLA Gold.

Professional career

Baillie previously played for the Ohio Aviators in the now defunct PRO Rugby. 

He also played for the London Scottish in the Green King IPA Championship and had a trial at Saracens on loan from London Scottish.

In 2019, Baillie signed with the NOLA Gold of Major League Rugby. He was made the team's captain for the 2021 season.

References

1991 births
Living people
Canada international rugby union players
Canadian rugby union players
Sportspeople from St. Albert, Alberta
Rugby union flankers
Rugby union locks
Prairie Wolf Pack players
Ohio Aviators players
Saracens F.C. players
London Scottish F.C. players
New Orleans Gold players
Toronto Arrows players